Scaphiodontophis is a genus of snakes in the family Colubridae. The genus is native to Mexico, Central America, and Colombia.

Species
The following two species are recognized as being valid. 
Scaphiodontophis annulatus (A.M.C. Duméril, Bibron & A.H.A. Duméril, 1854) – Guatemala neckband snake
Scaphiodontophis venustissimus (Günther, 1893) – common neckband snake

References

Further reading
Taylor EH, Smith HM (1943). "A Review of the American Sibynophine Snakes, with the Proposal of a New Genus". University of Kansas Science Bulletin 29: 301–337. (Scaphiodontophis, new genus, pp. 302–303).

Scaphiodontophis
Snake genera